Josefov is a town quarter in Prague, Czech Republic, known as the Jewish quarter.

Josefov may also refer to places in the Czech Republic:
Josefov, an administrative part of Jaroměř in the Hradec Králové Region
Josefov Fortress, a former fortress in Josefov
Josefov Meadows, a bird reserve near Josefov
Josefov (Hodonín District), a municipality and village in the South Moravian Region
Josefov (Sokolov District), a municipality and village in the Karlovy Vary Region

See also
Joseph II, Holy Roman Emperor